The index of physics articles is split into multiple pages due to its size.

To navigate by individual letter use the table of contents below.

X

X(3872)
X-ray
X-ray absorption fine structure
X-ray absorption spectroscopy
X-ray astronomy
X-ray astronomy detector
X-ray astronomy satellite
X-ray background
X-ray binary
X-ray burster
X-ray computed tomography
X-ray crystal truncation rod
X-ray crystallography
X-ray filter
X-ray fluorescence
X-ray generation
X-ray generator
X-ray image intensifier
X-ray machine
X-ray magnetic circular dichroism
X-ray microscope
X-ray nanoprobe
X-ray optics
X-ray photoelectron spectroscopy
X-ray pulsar
X-ray reflectivity
X-ray scattering techniques
X-ray spectroscopy
X-ray standing waves
X-ray telescope
X-ray tube
X-wave
XANES
XENON Dark Matter Search Experiment
X (charge)
X and Y bosons
X band
Xallarap
Xavier Le Pichon
Xi baryon
Xiao-Gang Wen
Xiaowei Zhuang
Xie Shengwu
Xie Xide

Indexes of physics articles